Lamprosema lateritialis is a moth in the family Crambidae. It was described by George Hampson in 1918. It is found in Ghana and Malawi.

The larvae have been recorded feeding on Pericopsis elata.

References

Moths described in 1918
Lamprosema
Moths of Africa